Myristica maxima (Latin for 'the largest') is a species of plant in the family Myristicaceae. It is found in Peninsular Malaysia, Singapore and Borneo.

Local names 

Borneo: Darah-darah, Koomping, Kumpang, Mandarahan, Rah.

References

 Asianplant.net Myristica maxima Warb., Mon. Myrist. (1897)

maxima
Trees of Malaya
Trees of Borneo
Least concern plants
Taxonomy articles created by Polbot